Zlata Đerić (born 23 December 1958) is a Serbian politician. She has served four terms in the National Assembly of Serbia and one term in the Assembly of Vojvodina. A leading member of New Serbia (Nova Srbija, NS) for many years, she now serves on the presidency of the New Democratic Party of Serbia (Nova demokratska stranka Srbije, NDSS), which until May 2022 was known as the Democratic Party of Serbia (Demokratska stranka Srbije, DSS).

Private career
Đerić was born in Sombor, Autonomous Province of Vojvodina, in what was then the People's Republic of Serbia in the Federal People's Republic of Yugoslavia. She graduated from the University of Novi Sad Faculty of Philosophy in 1982 and has published a number of works about the Serbian language and Serbian literature, including Psihologija srpske politike - Ispravljanje krive Drine.Злата Ђерић , METLA 2020, accessed 27 January 2021.

Politician
Early years and first assembly term
Đerić entered political life as a member of the Serbian Renewal Movement (Srpski pokret obnove, SPO). In the 1997 Serbian parliamentary election, she appeared in the lead position on the party's electoral list for the Sombor division. She would have automatically received a mandate had the list crossed the electoral threshold, but it did not. The SPO experienced a serious split the following year, and Đerić joined the breakaway New Serbia party under the leadership of Velimir Ilić.

Serbia's electoral system was reformed prior to the 2000 parliamentary election, such that the entire country was designated as a single electoral district and all mandates were assigned to candidates on successful lists at the discretion of the sponsoring parties or coalitions, irrespective of numerical order. New Serbia participated in the election as part of the Democratic Opposition of Serbia (DOS) (Demokratska opozicija Srbije, DOS), a broad and ideologically diverse coalition of parties opposed to the recently overthrown administration of Slobodan Milošević. Đerić was included on the DOS list in the 212th position. The list won a landslide victory with 176 out of 250 seats; she was not initially included in her party's assembly delegation but was awarded a mandate on 4 December 2001 as the replacement for another party member. New Serbia provided support for the DOS government until 2002, when it broke from the alliance and moved into opposition. In her first term, Đerić was a member of the committee for environmental protection and the committee for labor, veterans' affairs, and social affairs.

New Serbia contested the 2003 parliamentary election in an alliance with the SPO, and Đerić received the twelfth position on their combined list. The list won twenty-two seats, and she was not given a mandate. She later appeared in the second position on New Serbia's list for the 2004 Vojvodina provincial election. The list did not cross the electoral threshold for assembly representation.

Serbia introduced the direct election of mayors in the 2004 Serbian local elections, which took place concurrently with the provincial election. Đerić ran as New Serbia's candidate for mayor of Sombor; her campaign was also endorsed by Social Democracy (Socijaldemokratija, SD) and two smaller political movements. She was defeated in the first round of voting. The New Serbia list won three seats in the election for the Sombor city assembly; Đerić was elected and served for the next four years.Odbornici, National Assembly of the Republic of Serbia, 23 June 2007, accessed 12 February 2022. The direct election of mayors proved to be a short-lived experiment and was abandoned in 2008.

New Serbia contested the 2007 parliamentary election in an alliance with the Democratic Party of Serbia, and Đerić was given the sixteenth position on their combined list. The list won forty-seven seats, and she was once again not given a mandate afterward.

Return to the national assembly
The DSS and New Serbia continued their alliance into the 2008 parliamentary election; Đerić received the fiftieth position on their list and was given a mandate for a second assembly term when the list won thirty seats.11 June 2008 legislature, National Assembly of the Republic of Serbia, accessed 24 November 2017. In the concurrent 2008 Serbian local elections, New Serbia formed an alliance in Sombor with the Socialist Party of Serbia (Socijalistička partija Srbije, SPS) and other parties. Đerić received the third position on their combined list, which did not cross the threshold for assembly representation.Službeni List (Opštine Sombor), Volume 41 Number 6 (13 May 2008), p. 2.

The results of the parliamentary election were inconclusive, and serious discussions later took place between the DSS–NS alliance, the SPS, and the Serbian Radical Party (Srpska radikalna stranka, SRS) about forming a new coalition government. This ultimately did not happen; the SPS instead joined a coalition government with the For a European Serbia (Za evropsku Srbiju, ZES) alliance, and New Serbia served in opposition. Đerić became deputy chair of the committee on labour, veterans' affairs, and social affairs; she was also a member of the committee for gender equality, the working group on the rights of the child, and the parliamentary friendship groups with Israel, Italy, and the Sovereign Order of Malta.

Serbia's electoral system was again reformed in 2011, such that all mandates were awarded to candidates on successful lists in numerical order. New Serbia formed a new alliance with the Serbian Progressive Party (Srpska napredna stranka, SNS) and contested the 2012 parliamentary election on the latter's Let's Get Serbia Moving list. Đerić received the fifty-seventh position and was re-elected when the list won seventy-three mandates. The SNS and SPS subsequently formed a new coalition government that included New Serbia, and Đerić served as part of its parliamentary majority. In the 2012–14 parliament, she was a member of the committee for human and minority rights and gender equality, a deputy member of the foreign affairs committee and the committee on the rights of the child, and a member of Serbia's friendship groups with Denmark, Finland, Israel, Italy, Ukraine, and the United Kingdom.

She was given the sixty-ninth position on the Progressive Party's coalition list in the 2014 parliamentary election and was again re-elected when the list won a landslide majority victory with 158 mandates. She served afterward as a member of the committee on foreign affairs, the committee for human and minority rights and gender equality, and the committee on Kosovo and Metohija, and was a deputy member of the committee on the rights of the child. She was also a member of Serbia's delegation to the Parliamentary Dimension of the Central European Initiative, chaired Serbia's friendship groups with Chile and Ethiopia, and was a member of the friendship groups with Israel, Italy, Norway, and Russia. In September 2014, she was chosen to lead a working group on human rights and freedoms and the rights of the child.<ref>"Odbor za ljudska prava formirao pet radnih grupa", Radio Television of Serbia, 15 September 2014, accessed 26 January 2021.</ref>

Assembly of Vojvodina
Đerić did not seek re-election to the national assembly in 2016. She instead appeared in the tenth position on the SNS's coalition list in the 2016 Vojvodina provincial election and was elected to the provincial assembly when the list won sixty-three out of 120 mandates. She also led a list called "Truth – New Serbia" in Sombor in the concurrent 2016 local elections; this list did not cross the electoral threshold.

In early 2017, Velimir Ilić withdrew New Serbia's support for Serbia's SNS-led government at the republic level. This led to a split in the party, with several prominent members leaving in order to continue supporting the Progressives. Đerić initially remained with New Serbia; in the provincial assembly, she left the SNS's group and joined the opposition "Alternative for Vojvodina" group. She ultimately left New Serbia as well, however, and in 2018 she created her own political movement called "Team for Life" (Tim za Život). The group's primary focus was protecting what it considered the "demographic survival of Serbia" by increasing the country's birth rate.

2020 parliamentary election
Đerić led "Team for Life" into the METLA 2020 alliance (led by the DSS) in 2019 and served on the alliance's presidency. She received the fifth position on the alliance's list in the 2020 parliamentary election; the list did not cross the electoral threshold to win representation in the assembly. She later led "Team for Life" into the National Democratic Alternative (Nacionalno demokratska alternativa, NADA) in 2021.

New Democratic Party of Serbia
Đerić subsequently became a member of the New Democratic Party of Serbia, and in July 2022 she was elected to its presidency.

Electoral record

Local (Sombor)

References

1958 births
Living people
Politicians from Sombor
21st-century Serbian women politicians
21st-century Serbian politicians
Members of the National Assembly (Serbia)
Members of the Parliamentary Dimension of the Central European Initiative
Members of the Assembly of Vojvodina
Serbian Renewal Movement politicians
New Serbia politicians
Team for Life politicians
New Democratic Party of Serbia politicians
Women members of the National Assembly (Serbia)